Zylyftar Poda, born Iljaz Poda, (1768-1835) was an Albanian leader, who  led several revolts against the Ottoman Empire.

Life
Zylyftar Poda was born in 1768 in Podë, a village in the region of Kolonjë, south Albania. He became known during his service for Ali Pasha of Ioannina, a semi-independent ruler in Epirus. After Ali Pasha' death and the eventual destruction of his pashalik, Poda started to take part in revolts against the Ottoman Empire. He took part in a meeting of Albanian leaders in 1828 in Berat. There Poda was one of the three main participants, the others being Ismail Bey Qemali and Shahin bej Delvina. The meeting concluded with requests for Albanian officials in the areas with Albanian population and the removal of Reşid Mehmed Pasha, a local official with considerable power in parts of Epirus, from his official posts in Delvina, Vlora and Janina. In 1831 Poda led a peasant revolt in the region of Kolonjë and Leskovik, coordinating with other Albanian leaders such as the Bushati family. In 1835 Poda was executed by Ottoman authorities due to his activities for more rights for Albanians.

Legacy
Zylyftar Poda is considered one of the most important Albanian leaders of early 1800s, and many folk songs have been dedicated to him.

References

1768 births
1835 deaths
People from Kolonjë